Road Show is a 1941 American film directed by Hal Roach.

Plot 

Business millionaire Drogo Gaines (John Hubbard) is about to marry his fiancé Helen Newton (Polly Ann Young), but fakes a nervous breakdown before his own wedding because he has cold feet. He overhears Helen talk to her brother (Edward Norris) and mother (Florence Bates) about them losing Drogo's fortune if the wedding doesn't go through. This makes Drogo decide to call the wedding off entirely. Helen is furious and refuses to be dumped at the altar like this, attacking Drogo and trying to make it look like he is the one attacking her. Her brother Ed comes to her aid and knocks Drogo out. When Drogo wakes up again he is in a mental institution, and is considered insane and dangerous to others.

At the institution, Drogo meets wealthy eccentric Colonel Carleton Carraway (Adolphe Menjou). Carraway has admitted himself to the institution. In the dark of the night, Carraway helps Drogo escape, using a row boat, and they are picked up by carnival operator Penguin Moore (Carole Landis).

Drogo helps Penguin in return, by paying her fees to the sheriff (James C. Morton). Penguin doesn't want to accept the money, so Drogo suggests she takes a concession on a camera Carraway has invented in return.

When the land owner wants money from Penguin too, Drogo and Carraway help out by raising the money with illegal gambling. They are arrested but manage to escape with the help of Penguin. Drogo and Carraway has to hide from the police searching for them on the road, and they are nearly discovered by Helen, who has joined the search party.

They are spotted however, by Stanhope (Ted Stanhope), Drogo's personal secretary. Stanhope stays and hangs around the carnival to see what happens. Drogo falls in love with Penguin, who is the first girl he has met who doesn't want him for the money. Penguin makes both Drogo and Carraway work for their living with her. Still, the carnival doesn't turn a profit.

Drogo secretly sends Stanhope to buy new equipment for the carnival to improve the chances of profit. Penguin tries to market Drogo as her new acrobatic artist, but he is too incompetent to perform adequately. He gets support from Carraway, who tries to restore Drogo's reputation and convinces Penguin he was once a promising lion tamer. Penguin acquires two lions to improve their act. Drogo praises his luck when a storm ruins his chances of showing off as a lion tamer the first night.

The carnival takes refuge at the estate of Harry Whitman's (Charles Butterworth), who happens to be Carraway's nephew. Harry's friends are the audience, but a commotion arises when the lions come out of the cage. Eventually, Drogo manages to lure them back into the cage, but a fight starts when an outside party accuses the carnival of unfairness because of the higher prices charged at the private show. The fighting destroys the entire carnival. Harry pledges to reimburse Penguin for the damage.

Unaware to most of the present persons, Harry has stored the remains of the carnival in a barn on his estate, planning to set it on fire later in the night. He has a habit of doing this to have a reason to use his fire trucks to extinguish the fire.

Watching the carnival go up in flames, Penguin believes that her days as a carnival operator is over. But then Drogo shows her the new carnival equipment he has bought her. He has painted the names Moore & Gaines on it. Penguin thanks him by kissing him.

Cast 
Adolphe Menjou as Colonel Carleton Carroway
Carole Landis as Penguin Moore
John Hubbard as Drogo Gaines
Charles Butterworth as Harry Whitman
Patsy Kelly as Jinx
Shemp Howard as Moe 
George E. Stone as Indian
Margaret Roach as Priscilla
Polly Ann Young as Helen Newton
Edward Norris as Ed Newton
Marjorie Woodworth as Alice
Florence Bates as Mrs. Newton
Willie Best as Willie
The Charioteers

Soundtrack 
The Charioteers - "I Should Have Known You Years Ago" (Written by Hoagy Carmichael, lyrics by Harris Robison)
Carole Landis (dubbed by Martha Mears) - "I Should Have Known You Years Ago" (Written by Hoagy Carmichael, lyrics by Harris Robison)
The Charioteers - "Calliope Jane" (Written by Hoagy Carmichael)
The Charioteers - "Yum Yum" (Written by Hoagy Carmichael)

References

External links 

1941 films
1941 comedy films
American comedy films
American black-and-white films
Circus films
United Artists films
Films with screenplays by Harry Langdon
Films directed by Hal Roach
1940s English-language films
1940s American films